The Islamic Center of Tucson (ICT), also known as the Tucson Mosque, is a mosque and Islamic community center in Tucson, Arizona. Situated near the University of Arizona, the society serves as both a prayer space and a community center. It caters to all Muslims of southern Arizona and the larger community as a whole. It was completed in 1991 and has a single minaret and dome. It holds the 5 daily prayers as well as Jumu'ah on Fridays.

History
The history of the ICT community traces its roots back to university students that attended the University of Arizona in the 1960s. Since then, it has grown to encompass thousands of community members from converts to multi-generational families to young upstarts and more. The center serves as a place of worship, a place of gathering, a hub for community events, interfaith dialogue, and a cultural resource.

See also

 List of mosques in the Americas
 Lists of mosques
 List of mosques in the United States

References

Mosques in Arizona
Buildings and structures in Tucson, Arizona
Mosques completed in 1987
Religious buildings and structures in Arizona
1987 establishments in Arizona
Mosque buildings with domes